

Events and trends

 1605–1615 – Miguel de Cervantes writes the two parts of Don Quixote.
 1616: April – Death of both William Shakespeare and Miguel de Cervantes.
 1630-1651: William Bradford writes Of Plymouth Plantation, journals that are considered the most authoritative account of the Pilgrims and their government.
 1660–1669 – Samuel Pepys writes his diary.
 1667–68 – Marianna Alcoforado writes her Letters of a Portuguese Nun.
 1671–1696 – Madame de Sévigné writes her famous letters.
 Metaphysical poets
 German literature of the Baroque period

New books and plays
1600
Hamlet, Prince of Denmark by William Shakespeare
England's Helicon (anthology) – including work by Edmund Spenser, Michael Drayton, Thomas Lodge, Philip Sidney and others
Old Fortunatus – Thomas Dekker
The Spanish Moor's Tragedy – Thomas Dekker, John Marston, and William Haughton

1601
Twelfth Night, or What You Will by William Shakespeare
Cynthia's Revels – Ben Jonson
Disputationes Metaphysicae by Francisco Suárez first published
Satiromastix – Thomas Dekker

1602
Rymes by Lope de Vega
Troilus and Cressida by William Shakespeare
Antonio and Mellida (play) – John Marston
Mirum in Modum (poetry) – John Davies of Hereford
Satiromastix (play) – Thomas Dekker and John Marston
A Survey of Cornwall – Richard Carew

1603
The True Law of Free Monarchies by King James VI and I
Ane Godlie Dreame (poem) by Elizabeth Melville published in Edinburgh
Measure for Measure by William Shakespeare
Othello by William Shakespeare
The Tragical History of Doctor Faustus by Christopher Marlowe (published)

1604
All's Well That Ends Well by William Shakespeare
The Honest Whore (play) – Thomas Dekker
The Malcontent (play) – John Marston

1605
Timon of Athens by William Shakespeare
The Dutch Courtesan (play) – John Marston
The Tragedy of Philotas (play) – Samuel Daniel
The Tragedy of King Lear by William Shakespeare
Don Quixote (El Ingenioso Hidalgo Don Quijote de la Mancha), Part I – Miguel de Cervantes
Epistle concerning the Excellencies of the English Tongue – Richard Carew

1606
Macbeth by William Shakespeare
Antony and Cleopatra by William Shakespeare

1607
A Woman Killed with Kindness (play) – Thomas Heywood
Bussy D'Ambois (play) – George Chapman
Michaelmas Terme (play) – Thomas Middleton
The Knight of the Burning Pestle (play) – Francis Beaumont
The Famous History of Sir Thomas Wyatt (play) – Thomas Dekker and John Webster
The Legend of Great Cromwell – Michael Drayton
Pericles, Prince of Tyre by William Shakespeare
The Revenger's Tragedy by Thomas Middleton

1608
Coriolanus by William Shakespeare
A Nest of Ninnies – Robert Armin
Humour out of Breathe (play) – John Day
The Belman of London (play) – Thomas Dekker
The Merry Devil of Edmonton (play) – anonymous; has been attributed to William Shakespeare, Michael Drayton and others.

1609
The Winter's Tale by William Shakespeare
Jerusalem Conquered (epic poem) by Lope de Vega
Fourre Birds of Noahs Arke – Thomas Dekker

1610
Sidereus Nuncius by Galileo Galilei
Cymbeline by William Shakespeare
The Faithful Shepherdess (play) – John Fletcher

1611
Fuente Ovejuna (play) – Lope de Vega
The Authorized Version (King James version) of the Bible
The Tempest by William Shakespeare
Catiline his Conspiracy (play) – Ben Jonson
The Roaring Girle (play) – Thomas Dekker and Thomas Middleton

1612
Four Soluloquies – Lope de Vega
El comendador de Ocaña (Ocaña's mayor) – Lope de Vega
A Woman is a Weather-Cocke – Nathan Field

1613
Soledades – Luis de Góngora
La dama boba (the fool lady) – Lope de Vega
The Dog in the Manger (play) – Lope de Vega
Henry VIII by William Shakespeare
Tears on the Death of Moeliades – William Drummond of Hawthornden
The Revenge of Bussy D'Ambois – George Chapman
Purchas, his Pilgrimage; or, Relations of the World and the Religions observed in all Ages – Samuel Purchas

1614
Bartholomew Fair (play) – Ben Jonson
La Lira by Giambattista Marino
Fama fraternitatis Roseae Crucis oder Die Bruderschaft des Ordens der Rosenkreuzer – Johannes Valentinus Andreae

1615
Don Quixote, Part II – Miguel de Cervantes
El caballero de Olmedo (The knight from Olmedo) (play) – Lope de Vega
Confessio oder Bekenntnis der Societät und Bruderschaft Rosenkreuz – Johannes Valentinus Andreae

1616
Ben Jonson's Works
The Whole Works of Homer – George Chapman
Chymische Hochzeit Christiani Rosencreutz Anno 1459 – Johannes Valentinus Andreae
Rollo, Duke of Normandy (also known as The Bloody Brother) (?1616–30?) – John Fletcher, Ben Jonson, Philip Massinger, George Chapman (The drinking song)

1617
Warenar (play) by Pieter Corneliszoon Hooft
A Faire Quarrell (play) – Thomas Middleton and William Rowley

1618
History of Tythes – John Selden
Amends for Ladies (play) – Nathan Field

1619
A King and No King (play) – Beaumont and Fletcher
The Maid's Tragedy (play) – Beaumont and Fletcher
The Shoemaker's Holiday – Thomas Deloney
The Custome of the Countrey – John Fletcher and Philip Massinger
Reipublicae Christianopolitanae descriptio – Johannes Valentinus Andreae

1620
Philaster – Beaumont and Fletcher

1621
The Anatomy of Melancholy – Robert Burton
Women Beware Women – Thomas Middleton
El vergonzoso en palacio – Tirso de Molina
The Countess of Montgomery's Urania – Lady Mary Wroth

1623
The Heir (play) – Thomas May
The Historie of the Raigne of King Henry the Seventh – Francis Bacon
The French Disease – Richard Brome
The Beggar's Bush – John Fletcher
El tejedor de Segovia – Juan Ruiz de Alarcón
The Changeling – Thomas Middleton and William Rowley text

1623
L'Adone by Giambattista Marino
Love, honour and power (play) – Pedro Calderón de la Barca
The Duchess of Malfi – John Webster
First Folio – William Shakespeare

1624
Circe (poem) bu Lope de Vega
Nero Caesar, or Monarchie Depraved – Edmund Bolton
The Sun's Darling – John Ford

1625
De jure belli ac pacis by Hugo Grotius
Complete Essays  – Francis Bacon
Les Bergeries   – Racan

1626
El Buscón – Francisco de Quevedo

1627
England's schim (play) – Pedro Calderón de la Barca
The Bataile of Agincourt  – Michael Drayton
First Steps up Parnassus – Michael Drayton

1628
Microcosmographie – John Earle

1629
The Roman Actor (play) – Philip Massinger
La Dama Duende (play) – Pedro Calderón de la Barca
The Tragedy of Albovine (play) – William D'Avenant

1630
The Conceited Pedlar – Thomas Randolph

1631
The punishment without vengeance (play) – Lope de Vega

1632
L'Allegro – John Milton
La Dorotea – Lope de Vega
The Fatal Dowry (play) – Nathan Field and Philip Massinger
Dialogue Concerning the Two Chief World Systems by Galileo Galilei
The Muses’ Looking-Glass by Thomas Randolph

1633
A New Way to Pay Old Debts (play) – Philip Massinger
Love's Sacrifice (play) – John Ford
The Gamester (play) – James Shirley
The Temple (poetry) – George Herbert

1634
Tottenham Court (play) – Thomas Nabbes

1636
Life is a dream (play) – Pedro Calderón de la Barca
Le Cid (play) – Pierre Corneille

1637
La Vega del Parnaso (Parnasos' river bank) – Lope de Vega
Discourse on the Method – René Descartes

1638
Two New Sciences by Galileo Galilei
Alcione (play) – Pierre du Ryer

1639
Argalus and Parthenia (play) – Henry Glapthorne
The City Match – Jasper Mayne

1640
Horace (play) – Pierre Corneille
The Bay Psalm Book, the first book printed in North America
Joseph's coloured Coat – Thomas Fuller

1641
Meditations on First Philosophy – René Descartes
Episcopacy by Divine Right – Joseph Hall
The Cardinall (play) – James Shirley (first extant edition, 1652)
A Joviall Crew (play) – Richard Brome (first extant edition, 1652)

1642
 September: Playhouses closed in England by government order.
Religio Medici   Sir Thomas Browne
Saul (play) by Pierre du Ryer

1644
Principles of Philosophy – René Descartes
Areopagitica by John Milton

1646
Andronicus or the Unfortunate Politician – Thomas Fuller
 Pseudodoxia Epidemica or Vulgar Errors – Sir Thomas Browne

1647
Philosophical Poems – Henry More

1648
The Amorous War – Jasper Mayne
Hesperides by Robert Herrick (poet)
 Padmavati – Alaol (in Bengali)

1649
Eikon Basilike – John Gauden

1650
Silex scintillans – Henry Vaughan

1651
 El alcalde de Zalamea – Pedro Calderón de la Barca
 Leviathan – Thomas Hobbes
 Reliquiae Wottonianiae – Sir Henry Wotton (posthumous)
 Jeune Alcidiane – Marin le Roy de Gomberville

1652
Brief Character of the Low Countries – Owen Feltham
Theophilia or Love's Sacrifice (poetry) – Edward Benlowes
The Cardinall (play) – James Shirley

1653
A History of New England – Edward Johnson
The Compleat Angler – Izaak Walton
Poems and Fancies – Margaret Cavendish
The Princess Cloria – Percy Herbert, 2nd Baron Powis

1654
Lucifer (play) – Joost van den Vondel
Parlhenissa, a novel – Roger Boyle, 1st Earl of Orrery

1655
L'Étourdi ou les Contretemps first play by Molière

1656
 El gran teatro del mundo (World's great theatre) (play) – Pedro Calderón de la Barca
Nature's Pictures – Margaret Cavendish
Oceana by James Harrington

1657
Guárdate del agua mansa (Keep out from silent waters) – Pedro Calderón de la Barca
Katharina von Georgien (play) by Andreas Gryphius

1658
Hydriotaphia, Urn Burial  – Sir Thomas Browne
The Garden of Cyrus -Sir Thomas Browne

1659
 Sati Mayna O Lorchandrani – Alaol (in Bengali)
Lucasta – Richard Lovelace (posthumous)
Pharonnida – William Chamberlayne

1660
 Tohfa – Alaol (in Bengali)

1661
 by Samuel von Pufendorf

1662
A new edition of the Book of Common Prayer of the Church of England (this edition remains the officially authorised book to the present day).

1664
La Thébaïde (play) – Jean Racine

1665
Alexandre le Grand (Alexander the Great) (play) – Jean Racine
Memoires of François Bassompierre (posthumous)
 Saptapaykar – Alaol (in Bengali)

1666
Grace Abounding to the Chief of Sinners by John Bunyan

1667
Paradise Lost by John Milton
Andromaque by Jean Racine
Annus Mirabilis, the Year of Wonders 1666 – John Dryden
Secret Love (play) – John Dryden

1668
Le Tartuffe – Molière
The Miser – Molière
Simplicius Simplicissimus – Hans Jakob Christoffel von Grimmelshausen
Cyprianus Anglicanus – Peter Heylin
Essay of Dramatick Poesie – John Dryden
Observations upon Experimental Philosophy – Margaret Cavendish

1669
 Saifulmuluk O Badiujjamal – Alaol (in Bengali)

1670
Pensées by Blaise Pascal
The Conquest of Granada – John Dryden

1671
Madame de Sévigné writes her first letter
Samson Agonistes – John Milton
The Rehearsal (play) – George Villiers, 2nd Duke of Buckingham performed
Hayy ibn Yaqdhan by Ibn Tufail – translated into Latin by Edward Pococke the Younger as Philosophus Autodidactus
 Sikandarnama – Alaol (in Bengali)

1672
Bajacet (play) by Jean Racine
Marriage à la mode by John Dryden
The Rehearsal (play) by George Villiers, 2nd Duke of Buckingham published
Hayy ibn Yaqdhan by Ibn Tufail – translated into Dutch by Johannes Bouwmeester

1674
Iphigénie (play) by Jean Racine
The Tragedy of Nero, Emperour of Rome (play) – Nathaniel Lee

1675
The Country Wife by William Wycherley
Gerania; a New Discovery of a Little Sort of People, anciently discoursed of, called Pygmies by Joshua Barnes

1676
The Man of Mode (play) – George Etherege
English-Adventures by a Person of Honor – Roger Boyle, 1st Earl of Orrery

1677
Phèdre – Jean Racine
Treatise of the Art of War – Roger Boyle, 1st Earl of Orrery

1678
All for Love – John Dryden
The True Intellectual System of the Universe – Ralph Cudworth
The Pilgrim's Progress by John Bunyan
Threnodia Carolina – Sir Thomas Herbert

1679
Anima Mundi – Charles Blount

1680
The Life and Death of Mr Badman – John Bunyan

1681
Miscellaneous Poems by Andrew Marvell (posthumous)
Absalom and Achitophel by John Dryden

1682
The Life of an Amorous Man (好色一代男, Kōshoku Ichidai Otoko) by Ihara Saikaku

1685
Five Women Who Loved Love (好色五人女, Kōshoku Gonin Onna) by Ihara Saikaku

1686
Hayy ibn Yaqdhan by Ibn Tufail – translated into English by George Ashwell
The Life of an Amorous Woman (好色一代女, Kōshoku Ichidai Onna) by Ihara Saikaku

1687
 Philosophiæ Naturalis Principia Mathematica - Isaac Newton
The Hind and the Panther – John Dryden
The Hind and the Panther Transversed to the Story of the Country and the City Mouse – Matthew Prior
Bellamira, or The Mistress (play) – Sir Charles Sedley
The Great Mirror of Male Love (The Encyclopedia of Male Love) (男色大鑑, Nanshoku Okagami) by Ihara Saikaku

1688
The Eternal Storehouse of Japan (日本永代蔵, Nippon Eitaigura) by Ihara Saikaku

1689
The Massacre of Paris (play) – Nathaniel Lee
Table Talk – John Selden (posthumous)

1690
Amphitryon, or the Two Socias – John Dryden
An Essay Concerning Human Understanding – John Locke
Memoires of the Navy by Samuel Pepys

1691
Athalie (play) – Jean Racine

1692
Reckonings that Carry Men Through the World or This Scheming World (世間胸算用, Seken Munazan'yō) by Ihara Saikaku

1693
The Impartial Critick – John Dennis

1694
The Fatal Marriage (play) – Thomas Southerne

1696
Louis de Rouvroy, Duc de Saint-Simon starts writings his Memoirs

1697
A New Voyage Round the World – William Dampier

1698
The Campaigners (play) – Thomas D'Urfey

1699
Dialogues of the Dead – William King and Charles Boyle

Births
 1600 – Marin le Roy de Gomberville
 1601 – Baltasar Gracián
 1602 – Jean-Jacques Boissard
 1603 – Pierre Corneille
 1605 – Thomas Browne
 1607 – Francisco de Rojas Zorrilla
 1608 – Padre António Vieira/ John Milton
 1609 – Jean Rotrou
 1611 – William Cartwright; Thomas Urquhart
 1613 – John Cleveland
 1615 – Tanneguy Lefebvre
 1617 – Ralph Cudworth
 1620 – Lucy Hutchinson
 1621 – Hans Jakob Christoph von Grimmelshausen
 1622 – Molière
 1623 – Blaise Pascal
 1625 – Thomas Corneille
 1626 – Marie de Rabutin-Chantal, marquise de Sévigné
 1627 – John Flavel
 1628 – Miguel de Molinos
 1630 – Isaac Barrow
 1631 – John Dryden
 1632 – John Locke
 1632 – Baruch Spinoza
 1633 – Samuel Pepys
 1639 – Thomas Ellwood
 1640 – Aphra Behn
 1642 – Isaac Newton
 1643 – Gilbert Burnet
 1644 – Matsuo Bashō
 1646 – Gottfried Leibniz
 1648 – Robert Barclay
 1651 – William Dampier
 1652 – Thomas Otway
 1657 – Bernard le Bovier de Fontenelle
 1667 – Jonathan Swift
 1668 – Alain-René Lesage
 1675 – Louis de Rouvroy, duc de Saint-Simon
 1681 – Robert Keith
 1685 – George Berkeley
 1689 – Samuel Richardson
 1694 – Voltaire
 1698 – Metastasio

Deaths
 1600 – Richard Hooker (theologian)
 1605 – John Stow
 1607 – Sir Edward Dyer
 1612 – Juan de la Cueva; Robert Armin
 1615 – Mateo Alemán
 1616 – William Shakespeare; Miguel de Cervantes; Francis Beaumont; Richard Hakluyt
 1621 – Guillaume du Vair
 1623 – William Camden
 1624 – Stephen Gosson
 1625 – John Fletcher; Thomas Lodge
 1626 – Lancelot Andrewes; Samuel Purchas
 1627 – Luis de Góngora
 1631 – Michael Drayton; Guillén de Castro y Bellvis
 1633 – Abraham Fraunce
 1634 – George Chapman
 1635 – Lope de Vega; Thomas Randolph; Richard Corbet; John Hall (son-in-law of Shakespeare)
 1638 – Robert Aytoun
 1639 – Juan Ruiz de Alarcón
 1640 – Philip Massinger; Robert Burton
 1641 – Augustine Baker
 1643 – William Cartwright
 1644 – Luis Vélez de Guevara; Francis Quarles
 1645 – Francisco de Quevedo; William Lithgow
 1647 – Francis Meres
 1648 – Tirso de Molina; Alonso de Castillo Solórzano; George Abbot; Vincent Voiture
 1650 – René Descartes
 1658 – Baltasar Gracián; Pierre du Ryer
 1660 – Thomas Urquhart
 1661 – María de Zayas y Sotomayor
 1662 – François le Métel de Boisrobert
 1667 – Georges de Scudéry
 1672 – Anne Bradstreet; Tanneguy Lefebvre
 1673 – Molière
 1674 – Marin le Roy de Gomberville
 1676 – Hans Jakob Christoph von Grimmelshausen
 1678 – Andrew Marvell
 1679 – Thomas Hobbes
 1681 – Pedro Calderón de la Barca
 1682 – Thomas Browne
 1685 – Thomas Otway
 1688 – John Bunyan; Ralph Cudworth
 1689 – Aphra Behn
 1691 – Richard Baxter; John Flavel
 1696 – Miguel de Molinos; Madame de Sévigné

Wikisource reference work
 The First Half of the Seventeenth Century (1906) by Herbert J. C. Grierson.  Periods of European Literature series, vol. 7. George Edward Bateman Saintsbury, ed.  Edinburgh and London:  William Blackwood and Sons.

See also
 17th century in poetry
German literature of the Baroque period
French literature of the 17th century
Early Modern English literature
Baroque literature
Early Modern literature
16th century in literature
1700 in literature
18th century in literature
list of years in literature

External links

Bartleby - Table of Principal Dates

 
 
History of literature
Early Modern literature